Charles Alfred Miller is an American computer security researcher with Cruise Automation. Prior to his current employment, he spent five years working for the National Security Agency and has worked for Uber.

Education 
Miller holds a bachelor's degree in mathematics with a minor in philosophy from the then called Northeast Missouri State, and a Ph.D. in mathematics from the University of Notre Dame in 2000. He lives in Wildwood, Missouri.

Security research 
 Miller was a lead analyst at Independent Security Evaluators, a computer protection consultancy. He has publicly demonstrated many security exploits of Apple products. In 2008, he won a $10,000 cash prize at the hacker conference Pwn2Own in Vancouver, British Columbia, Canada for being the first to find a critical bug in the MacBook Air. In 2009, he won $5,000 for cracking Apple's Safari browser. Also in 2009, he and Collin Mulliner demonstrated an SMS processing vulnerability that allowed for complete compromise of the Apple iPhone and denial-of-service attacks on other phones. In 2011, he found a security hole in the iPhone and iPad, whereby an application can contact a remote computer to download new unapproved software that can execute any command that could steal personal data or otherwise using iOS applications functions for malicious purposes. As a proof of concept, Miller created an application called Instastock that was approved by Apple's App Store. He then informed Apple about the security hole, who promptly expelled him from the App Store.

Miller participated in research on discovering security vulnerabilities in NFC (Near Field Communication).

Miller, along with Chris Valasek, is known for remotely hacking a 2014 Jeep Cherokee and controlling the braking, steering, and acceleration of the vehicle.

Publications 

 iOS Hacker Handbook
 The Mac Hacker's Handbook
 Fuzzing for Software Security Testing and Quality Assurance
Battery firmware hacking: inside the innards of a smart battery

References

External links 
 
 
 
 
 
 

Living people
University of Notre Dame alumni
Computer security specialists
Year of birth missing (living people)